Rakopotamos (Greek: Ρακοπόταμος Λάρισας) is a beach of the municipal unit of Melivoia, Larissa, Greece.

The seaside settlement is away 8 km from Agiokampos and 15 km from Melivoia. The beach is sandy with some pebbles and the access to it is via two near paths leading to the beach, after the bridge of Rakopotamos.

References
Inthessaly.gr, Ρακοπόταμος Λάρισας
 Rakopotamos, Larissa on wikimapia

Beaches of Greece
Populated places in Larissa (regional unit)
Tourist attractions in Thessaly
Landforms of Thessaly
Landforms of Larissa (regional unit)